Trick Shot (Buck Chisholm) is a fictional character, a supervillain in the Marvel Comics universe. He first appeared in Solo Avengers #1 (December 1987) and was created by Tom DeFalco and Mark Bright. Trick Shot's introduction was a retcon to Hawkeye's origins, explaining how the character became a talented archer.

Publication history
Trick Shot has featured as both an enemy and ally of Hawkeye in Solo Avengers #1-5 (1987), Avengers Spotlight #23-25 (1989), Hawkeye Vol. 2 #1-4 (1994), Hawkeye Vol. 3 #2-3 & #5 (2004) and Hawkeye: Blindspot #1 (2011). The character has also appeared in a minor role in Captain America #411-414 (1993).

Fictional character biography
Buck Chisholm was a member of the Carson Carnival of Travelling Wonders. Using the name Trick Shot, Chisholm had an archery act which was one of the star attractions of the carnival. Chisholm was also a petty conman with a drinking problem. A rival member of the carnival, Jacques Duquesne, won a large amount of money off Chisholm in a poker game. Duquesne agreed to forget about the debt if Chisholm agreed to teach his young pupil how to use a bow and arrow (in an attempt to add a new spark to Duquesne's failing Swordsman act). Chisholm took the young man, Clint Barton, under his wing and taught him the art of archery. Later, the young Clint discovered that Duquesne was stealing from the carnival's paymaster. He attempted to turn his mentor over to the law but Duquesne managed to catch him before he could. As Duquesne was about to silence Clint, Chisholm (and Clint's brother Barney) rescued the boy and agreed to become his new mentor.

Later, Chisholm convinced Clint to help him rob a wealthy criminal's mansion. During the robbery, Clint shoots one of the guards with an arrow. He soon discovers that the injured guard is, in fact, his brother, Barney. Clint refuses to leave his brother's side, much to Chisholm's anger. Seeing this act as a betrayal against him, Chisholm shoots Clint in the shoulder with an arrow. He states that if he sees Clint again, he will kill him. Chisholm went on to become a hired mercenary and supervillain known as Trick Shot.

Illness
Years later, due to his excessive drinking and unhealthy living, Trick Shot developed cancer. Rather than die in a hospital bed, he decided to issue his former pupil with a death challenge, an honorable duel that he fully intended on losing. Clint, now the superhero and Avenger Hawkeye, felt that he had no alternative to answer the challenge due to the unfinished business between the pair. On an uninhabited island in the Greek isles, Trick Shot and Hawkeye battled one another, each relying on their archery skills. Hawkeye began to wonder why Trick Shot was holding back with his shots. He found his answer when he defeated his former mentor. Trick Shot revealed the reasons behind his challenge and his desire to die with honor. Instead of killing him, Hawkeye promised to help fund Trick Shot's medical care.

Remission
Trick Shot was told by doctors that his cancer had gone into remission. Later, he learned that the supervillain Crossfire had placed a bounty on Hawkeye's right arm and a number of supervillains (including the Bobcat, the Brothers Grimm, the Bullet Biker, the Death-Throws, Mad Dog and Razor Fist) tried to claim the reward. Trick Shot aided his former pupil and Mockingbird to defeat the bounty hunting supervillains.

Trick Shot, along with another supervillain called Javelynn, was hired by the Viper and the Secret Empire to protect a top secret research facility in the Canadian Rockies. Hawkeye, who had isolated himself in the area after the apparent death of his wife Mockingbird, stumbled across the research facility by accident. The Avenger battled Trick Shot and Javelynn and barely escaped with his life. Later, witnessing the cruelty of the Secret Empire, Trick Shot abandoned his mercenary contract and aided Hawkeye against a 'Bio-Com' (a Biological Combat Unit, a monstrous canine-like creature created at the Secret Empire's research facility). After the battle, Trick Shot offers his condolences to Hawkeye regarding his wife and gives him the information he needs to take down the Viper and the Secret Empire for good. Trick Shot then leaves Hawkeye to face the evil organization and retires from being a supervillain.

Death
Years later, Trick Shot's cancer returned. Baron Helmut Zemo offered to help fund the treatment, but only if Trick Shot trains the resurrected Barney Barton to be a master archer. Trick Shot agreed, but he was soon double-crossed when the training was completed. He was then badly beaten and his cancer is allowed to fester over a sustained period. Later, the dying Trick Shot was delivered to Avengers Tower to get the attention of Hawkeye. The Avengers tried to save him, but they were too late. Before he died, Trick Shot warned Hawkeye of the new villainous Barney Barton's impending danger. Later, while battling Hawkeye, Barney Barton declared himself as the new Trickshot.

Powers and abilities
Trick Shot has no superhuman powers, though he has extremely well honed archery skills. Trick Shot's weight and medical condition reduce his ability to function at peak performance levels for extended periods of time, resulting in a below normal stamina.  Trick Shot uses a hunter's bow, and a wide variety of trick arrows, such as smoke bombs, bola arrows, 360 degree arrows, and many others.

In other media
 Trick Shot appears in the Avengers Assemble episode "Crime and Circuses", voiced by Travis Willingham. This version is a member of the Circus of Crime and the second holder of the Trick Shot mantle after Clint Barton.

References

External links
 Trick Shot at Marvel.com
 

Characters created by Tom DeFalco
Comics characters introduced in 1987
Fictional archers
Fictional circus performers
Marvel Comics supervillains